The Federal budget 2017–18 was the federal budget of Pakistan for the fiscal year beginning from 1 July 2017 and ending on 30 June 2018.

It was presented by Finance Minister Ishaq Dar on 26 May 2017 at the National Assembly with a total outlay of ₨. 4.75 tn. This is the fifth federal budget submitted during the tenure of Prime Minister Nawaz Sharif and his cabinet.

The budget was presented following a protest of the Pakistan Kissan Ittehad, demanding subsidies on fertilisers and electricity bills, at D-Chowk in Islamabad.

The budget proposed a 10.0% increase in the salaries and pensions of federal government employees and an increase in the minimum monthly wage from ₨. 14,000 to ₨. 15,000. The allocation made for Benazir Income Support Programme stood at ₨.121 billion for 5.5 million beneficiaries. The defence expenditure of ₨.920.2 billion (or 19.36% of total budget outlay) which was around 7% higher than it was in the outgoing year was set aside.

Budget

References

Pakistani budgets
Nawaz Sharif administration
Pakistan federal budget
Pakistan federal budget
federal budget
federal budget